The 1988 Australian Bicentennial Gold Cup was a one-off association football tournament to celebrate the bincentennial of first settlement at Port Jackson by Captain Arthur Phillip in 1788. It was contested by 1988 AFC Asian Cup winners Saudi Arabia, 1986 FIFA World Cup winners Argentina, world number one-ranked side Brazil and host nation Australia.

The tournament was particularly notable for Australian fans for a remarkable extreme-long range goal scored by Charlie Yankos in Australia's unexpected 4–1 win over then World Champions Argentina. Brazil were eventual winners, beating Australia 2–0 in the final. Argentina took out 3rd place beating Saudi Arabia 2–0 in the third place match.

Participants
  Argentina
  Australia
  Brazil
  Saudi Arabia

Format
Teams played each other once in a round robin group stage. Each team was awarded 2 points for a win, 1 for a draw and 0 for a loss. The top two teams from the group played in a final and the bottom two teams played in a 3rd place match.

Summary

Group stage

Third place

Final

Awards

Statistics

Goalscorers

See also
1988 in Brazilian football

References

External links
 Australia Bicentenary Gold Cup on the RSSSF

1988
Bicentenary
1988 in Brazilian football
1988–89 in Argentine football
1988–89 in Saudi Arabian football
Australian bicentennial commemorations
International men's association football invitational tournaments